The Barrier River is a river in the Mount Aspiring National Park in northern Southland, New Zealand.
The Barrier River is fed by three glaciers and ice fields:
 Demon Gap Icefall (North Branch)
 Silver Glacier (via Silver Stream, between the branches)
 Barrier Ice Stream (South Branch)

See also
List of rivers of New Zealand

References

Rivers of Southland, New Zealand
Mount Aspiring National Park
Rivers of New Zealand